Empire of Haiti may refer to:

 First Empire of Haiti, the regime under Jean-Jacques Dessalines (Jacques I) from 1804 to 1806
 Second Empire of Haiti, the regime under Faustin Soulouque (Faustin I) from 1849 to 1859

See also
 Kingdom of Haiti, the regime under Henri Christophe (Henri I) from 1811 to 1820